George McDonald Carew (4 June 1910 – 9 December 1974) was a cricketer who edplayed four Test matches for the West Indies between 1935 and 1948. He was a right-hand batsman from Barbados where he ran a taxi business.

He is best remembered for his innings in the Second Test against England at Port of Spain in 1947–48, when he scored 107 in a first wicket partnership with Andy Ganteaume that put on 173 runs. Wisden reported: "Wearing a chocolate-coloured felt hat and chewing gum the whole time, Carew, in an unorthodox display, used the hook and pull freely in a dazzling exhibition." He toured India with the West Indian team later that year but played only one Test.

References

External links

1910 births
1974 deaths
Barbados cricketers
West Indies Test cricketers
Barbadian cricketers